The Communications, Space and Technology Commission (CST; , Hai'at al-Ittisalat wa Tiqniyyat al-Ma`lumat) is the Saudi communications authority. It was first established under the name of Saudi Communications Commission in accordance with the decision of the Council of Ministers. The name was changed after the commission was assigned new tasks related to information technology. Since October 2006, CITC has been handling the DNS structure and filtering in Saudi Arabia in the place of KACST (King Abdulaziz City for Science and Technology).

Censorship

The Communications, Space and Technology Commission is responsible for regulating the Internet and for hosting a firewall which blocks access to thousands of websites, mainly due to sexual and political content. Access to Megaupload has been intermittently blocked by the Internet authorities in Saudi Arabia.

ICT sector 
CST] is responsible for regulating the ICT sector in Saudi Arabia. The Telecommunications Act, issued by Royal Decree in 2001, provide the legal framework for organizing this sector. This Act involves a number of objectives such as: Providing advanced and adequate telecommunication services with affordable prices, creating an appropriate atmosphere to encourage fair competition, using frequencies effectively, localization of telecommunication technology and managing recent advancements, clarity and transparency in procedures, equality and neutrality, protection of the public interest as well as the interest of users and investors.

Postal services 
Since the end of 2019, CITC became responsible for regulating the postal sector in Saudi Arabia. This involved studying the current market, improving regulatory environment and supporting service providers to enhance the quality of their services.

New technology 
In alignment with the Saudi Vision 2030 and the National transformation program 2020, CITC is keen on facilitating the growth and localization of the IT & Tech sector in Kingdom. By 2023, CITC aims to increase the IT and emerging Tech market size, by regulating and licensing these technologies, and driving global investment.

Services 
Complaints
Report
Argami
Coverage maps 
Spectrum
Radio Type Approval 
Domain Name Registration
Equipment licensing
Meqyas
Boniah

Board Membership
 Ahmed Alsuwaiyan (March 2017 – May 2021).

References

External links
Communications and Information Technology Commission
Radio Type Approval Services for Saudi-Arabia CST/CITC

Communications authorities
Telecommunications in Saudi Arabia
Government agencies of Saudi Arabia
Censorship in Saudi Arabia
Regulation in Saudi Arabia